Chong Yee-Voon (Pha̍k-fa-sṳ: Chûng Yì-vùn, Kampar, Perak, February 13, 1969) is a Malaysian writer in the Chinese language. She is professor of the Department of Chinese Linguistics and Literature in Yuan Ze University, Taiwan.

She studied at the National Taiwan Normal University. Her husband Chan Tah Wei, a Malaysian writer, was her classmate.

Selected works
1995:河宴
1998:垂釣睡眠
2000:聽說
2002:我和我豢養的宇宙
2005:飄浮書房
2007:野半島
2008:陽光如此明媚
2010:陳義芝編選
2014:麻雀樹

References 

1969 births
Living people
Malaysian writers
Malaysian people of Chinese descent
Chinese-language writers
Malaysian expatriates in Taiwan
Malaysian women writers
National Taiwan Normal University alumni
People from Kampar, Perak
People from Perak